Gloioxanthomyces nitidus, commonly known as the shining waxcap, is a species of fungus in the family Hygrophoraceae. It was originally described by Miles Berkeley and Moses Ashley Curtis in 1853 as a species of Hygrophorus. The specific epithet nitidus means "shining". It was one of two species transferred to the newly created genus Gloioxanthomyces in 2013. The pale yellow, waxy gills are decurrent, with a somewhat distant spacing. Other than the gills and the base of the stipe, the bright coloring of the fruitbody fades with age. Spores are elliptical, smooth, and measure 6–10 by 4–6 µm. It is found in North America, where it grows on the ground (often among mosses) in groups in coniferous or mixed forests. It prefers bogs, swamps, and similar moist habitats.

References

External links

Hygrophoraceae
Fungi described in 1853
Fungi of North America
Taxa named by Miles Joseph Berkeley